Endometrial hyperplasia is a condition of excessive proliferation of the cells of the endometrium, or inner lining of the uterus.

Most cases of endometrial hyperplasia result from high levels of estrogens, combined with insufficient levels of the progesterone-like hormones which ordinarily counteract estrogen's proliferative effects on this tissue. This may occur in a number of settings, including obesity, polycystic ovary syndrome, estrogen producing tumours (e.g. granulosa cell tumour) and certain formulations of estrogen replacement therapy.

Endometrial hyperplasia with atypia is a significant risk factor for the development or even co-existence of endometrial cancer, so careful monitoring and treatment of women with this disorder is essential.

Classification

Like other hyperplastic disorders, endometrial hyperplasia initially represents a physiological response of endometrial tissue to the growth-promoting actions of estrogen. However, the gland-forming cells of a hyperplastic endometrium may also undergo changes over time which predispose them to cancerous transformation. Several histopathology subtypes of endometrial hyperplasia are recognisable to the pathologist, with different therapeutic and prognostic implications.

The most commonly used classification system for endometrial hyperplasia is the World Health Organization (WHO) system, which previously had four categories: simple hyperplasia without atypia, complex hyperplasia without atypia, simple atypical hyperplasia and complex atypical hyperplasia. In 2014, the WHO updated the classification system and removed the distinction between simple or complex hyperplasia, instead only on presence or absence of atypia.  
 Endometrial hyperplasia (simple or complex) - Irregularity and cystic expansion of glands (simple) or crowding and budding of glands (complex) without worrisome changes in the appearance of individual gland cells. In one study, 1.6% of patients diagnosed with these abnormalities eventually developed endometrial cancer.
 Atypical endometrial hyperplasia (simple or complex) - Simple or complex architectural changes, with worrisome (atypical) changes in gland cells, including cell stratification, tufting, loss of nuclear polarity, enlarged nuclei, and an increase in mitotic activity. These changes are similar to those seen in true cancer cells, but atypical hyperplasia does not show invasion into the connective tissues, the defining characteristic of cancer. The previously mentioned study found that 22% of patients with atypical hyperplasia eventually developed cancer.

Diagnosis
Diagnosis of endometrial hyperplasia can be made by endometrial biopsy, which is done in the office setting or through curettage of the uterine cavity to obtain endometrial tissue for histopathologic analysis. A workup for endometrial disease may be prompted by abnormal uterine bleeding, or the presence of atypical glandular cells on a pap smear.

Prognosis 
Many studies have shown that endometrial hyperplasia can progress to cancer, particularly when there are atypical cells. Nevertheless, such studies has typically dealt with atypical hyperplasia. A review of 65 articles on estimated risk of progression to cancer concludes that none of those studies reported estimates specifically for non-atypical hyperplasia patients. Further it states the need for population based studies including both non-atypical and atypical hyperplasia to accurately estimate the risk of progression to cancer.

If untreated with hysterectomy, endometrial hyperplasia progresses to adenocarcinoma within 20 years in:

 28% of cases with atypia (95% CI, 8.6% to 42.5%), and 
 about 5% of cases without atypia.

The rates are more favorable in cases with simple rather than complex hyperplasia, but as mentioned above this terminology was phased out of the WHO classification in 2014.

In patients with samples showing atypia, carcinoma is already present in over 40% of cases. Given this, the aforementioned 28% atypia progression rate may be an underestimate, and the true number may closer to the 42.5% part of the study's remarkably wide confidence interval.

Treatment
Treatment of endometrial hyperplasia is individualized, and may include hormonal therapy, such as cyclic or continuous progestin therapy, or hysterectomy.

See also
 Endometrial intraepithelial neoplasia
Endometrial carcinoma
Hyperplasia

References

External links 

Gynaecological cancer
Noninflammatory disorders of female genital tract